Urych  is a village (selo) in Stryi Raion, Lviv Oblast, of  Western Ukraine. It belongs to Skole urban hromada, one of the hromadas of Ukraine. Local government — Pidhorodetska village council.

Geography 
It is a village located in the valley of the ridges of rock groups. The rocks located in the middle of the remnants of a massive and stone eroded Paleocene (55 million absolute age.). These of the rock are ancient Rus Rock defense the cliff-side fortress complex of Tustan’.

History 
The village was founded in 1369 and is located south of the famous resort Skhidnytsia.  1920-1939 situated in Stanisławów Voivodeship.
Wehrmacht soldiers burned here about 100 Polish soldiers in September 1939. 

Until 18 July 2020, Urych belonged to Skole Raion. The raion was abolished in July 2020 as part of the administrative reform of Ukraine, which reduced the number of raions of Lviv Oblast to seven. The area of Skole Raion was merged into Stryi Raion.

Attractions 
In the village there is one architectural monument of local importance of Stryi Raion–- Church of Sts. Nicholas (wood) 19th century (2378-М), operates a museum  history of Ruthenian Tustan fortress.

References

External links 
 Urych: Ukraine
 village Urych
 Населенні пункти Сколівського району  -  Урич 
 weather.in.ua

Villages in Stryi Raion